Barcani is a commune in Covasna County, in the geographical region of Transylvania, Romania. It is composed of three villages: Barcani, Lădăuți (Ladóc) and Sărămaș (Szaramás). It also included Valea Mare village before it was split off to form a separate commune in 1999. The commune is situated south of Zagon, in the southeastern part of Covasna County.

Demographics
The commune has absolute ethnic Romanian majority. According to the 2002 census, it has a population of 3,836 of which 99.63% or 3,822 are Romanians. The rest of the population is Hungarian, with a population of 14 or 0.36%.

References

External links
 Official site

Communes in Covasna County
Localities in Transylvania